Vera Vasilyevna Pochitayeva (born 29 August 1974) is a Russian rower. She competed at the 1996 Summer Olympics and the 2000 Summer Olympics in the coxless pair events.

References

1974 births
Living people
Russian female rowers
Olympic rowers of Russia
Rowers at the 1996 Summer Olympics
Rowers at the 2000 Summer Olympics
Sportspeople from Lipetsk